Global Rapid Rugby was an international rugby union competition that launched a showcase series for six professional teams in 2019,  played in locations across the Asia-Pacific region. Rapid Rugby matches are slightly shorter than the traditional 80 minutes and have other variations from standard rugby laws that are intended to increase the speed of the game.

The 2020 Global Rapid Rugby season was cancelled due to the coronavirus pandemic after only one completed round of competition.

History
The competition was conceived and is supported by the Australian billionaire Andrew Forrest. It was devised after the Western Force rugby team based in Perth, Western Australia was unilaterally dropped from the Australian Super Rugby Conference.

Background

Following SANZAAR's decision to reduce the number of Super Rugby teams for 2018, the Australian Rugby Union (now Rugby Australia) announced in August 2017 that the Western Force would be one of the teams cut from the 2018 competition. In the following month, Perth-based businessman Andrew Forrest announced that he would create a new tournament called the Indo Pacific Rugby Championship which would include the Western Force and five other teams from the Indo-Pacific region.

For the 2018 season, the competition was launched as World Series Rugby, played as a series of exhibition matches as the precursor to a wider Asia-Pacific competition planned for 2019. The newly reformed Western Force played international teams from Hong Kong, Samoa, and Tonga along with Super Rugby teams the Crusaders and Melbourne Rebels, Japanese Top League team Panasonic Wild Knights, and the Fiji Warriors, the second-tier national side. The series began on 4 May 2018.

Rapid Rugby launched
The competition was re-branded in November 2018 as Global Rapid Rugby, and the Hong Kong Rugby Union was appointed the governing body for the competition ahead of the 2019 season. A season of fourteen matches was played in 2019, featuring the Western Force playing a Pacific Showcase Series in a round-robin format with teams from Fiji and Samoa, as well as an Asian Showcase Series in a round-robin format with teams based out of Hong Kong and Singapore. One-off matches were also played against a World XV coached by Robbie Deans, and the Malaysia Valke. The Singapore-based team, the Asia Pacific Dragons, did not continue in Rapid Rugby after the 2019 season and was replaced by the China Lions in 2020.

Teams
Six teams compete in Rapid Rugby:

Champions
{|
|-
|valign="top" |

Conference winners by team
In 2019, 5 teams played in 2 conferences. With teams playing each team in their own conference twice (home and away) except Western Force played teams in both conferences. The winner of each conference is awarded a home final.

Law variations
Law variations for Rapid Rugby included:

  Power try
 A 9-point 'power try' for attacks launched within 22 meters of the scoring team's own try line.

Set piece time limits
 Time limits for scrums (1 minute) and lineouts (45 seconds to set), 

Kicking to touch
 Teams cannot gain ground when kicking direct to touch, even from within their 22. Kicking to touch from inside the 22 is the same as the World Rugby law for outside the 22.

Game duration
 Matches last 70 minutes (compared with 80 minutes under the standard rugby union laws), 

Super Rugby in Australia averages around 30-minutes of ‘ball-in-play’ per match. However, the matches in 2018 World Series Rugby – the precursor to Rapid Rugby – had a comparable 'ball-in-play' time almost 30% greater.

Players
Global Rapid Rugby aims to attract about 20 of the world's top 100 rugby players with marquee contracts to be spread across the eight franchises. There is no salary cap in place for the competition.

Media coverage

Rapid Rugby currently has live broadcast television coverage in 18 countries across Asia and Oceania. Live streaming and video on demand services reach additional viewers within some Asia-Pacific countries, while Rapid Rugby's own website provides live streams and highlight packages to other regions worldwide.

For the 2019 showcase series, nine of the fourteen matches over the season were televised. Fox Sports in Australia and related companies Star Sports and Fox Sports Asia will provide the live coverage.

National broadcaster SBS showed all nine of these matches live on free-to-air television across Australia via its SBS Viceland channel and also streamed through SBS on Demand. Other Rapid Rugby media partners included Kayo Sports in Australia, Sky Sport in New Zealand and Fiji TV.

Corporate relations

Sponsorship
The 2019 showcase series does not currently have a principal naming rights partner, but major official partners include IHG Hotels & Resorts, K&L Gates and Harvey Beef.

The official rugby ball supplier is Rhino Sport.

See also 

 Asia Rugby
 Oceania Rugby
 National Rugby Championship

References

External links 
 

 

2018 establishments in Australia
Sports leagues established in 2018

Professional sports leagues in Australia
Professional sports leagues in China
Multi-national professional rugby union leagues
Multi-national professional sports leagues
Sports leagues disestablished in 2020